Stalita is a genus of European woodlouse hunting spiders that was first described by J. C. Schiödte in 1847.

Species
 it contains four species:
Stalita hadzii Kratochvíl, 1934 – Slovenia
Stalita inermifemur Roewer, 1931 – Slovenia, Croatia
Stalita pretneri Deeleman-Reinhold, 1971 – Croatia
Stalita taenaria Schiödte, 1847 (type) – Italy, Slovenia, Croatia

References

Araneomorphae genera
Dysderidae